JTC may mean:

Jack Chick
JTC Corporation of Singapore
ISO/IEC JTC 1, Joint Technical Committee 1 of the International Organization for Standardization (ISO) and the International Electrotechnical Commission (IEC)
Japanese Touring Car Championship
Jewish Trust Corporation, a body formed to pursue claims for the restitution of heirless property taken during the Nazi regime
James Trademore, a fictional character from Kamen Rider: Dragon Knight nicknamed "JTC"
Bauru-Arealva Airport in Brasil (IATA code)
James T. Cotton, an alias of American musician Dabrye
Jumping to conclusions
Juventus Training Center (Vinovo), an Italian football facility in Vinovo, 14 kilometres from the city of Turin
Juventus Training Center (Turin), an Italian football facility in the city of Turin